The 8.8 cm SK L/45 (SK - Schnelladekanone (quick loading cannon) L - Länge (with a 45-caliber barrel)) was a German naval gun that was used in World War I and World War II on a variety of mounts.

Description
It used a vertical sliding-block, or "wedge", as it is sometimes referred to, breech design.

History

During World War I, the SK L/45 was used as anti-torpedo boat guns on all Imperial German Navy dreadnoughts and as main guns on torpedo boats and destroyers.  The SK L/45 was also used to replace some of the 8.8 cm SK L/35 anti-torpedo boat guns on pre-dreadnought battleships.  During the 1920s SK L/45 guns were temporarily fitted to the Deutschland-class cruisers and on Königsberg-class cruisers until the new 8.8 cm SK C/32 naval gun was available, with most ships being refitted by 1939.  During the 1930s surviving SK L/45 guns were modified to use the same ammunition as the 8.8 cm SK C/30 naval gun and had similar performance.

Ammunition
Ammunition Types Available:
 Armor Piercing (AP) - 
 High Explosive (HE) - 
 High Explosive Incendiary (HEI)  - 
 Illumination (ILLUM) -

Versions 
 8.8 cm SK L/45 naval gun in MPL C/06 and MPL C/13 mountings
 8.8 cm Flak L/45 anti-aircraft gun in MPL C/13 mounting
 8.8 cm TbtsK L/45 torpedo boat gun in TbtsL C/13 mounting

See also
 List of naval guns

Notes

References

External links

 

88 mm artillery
Naval guns of Germany
Anti-aircraft guns of Germany
Naval anti-aircraft guns
World War I naval weapons